The Dartmoor Discovery is an ultramarathon run around Dartmoor in early June (recently the first Saturday in June). The race is entirely on roads. It starts and finishes in Princetown, famous as the home of Dartmoor Prison. The current distance is 52.115 km (32 miles 674 yards). Entrants are required to have completed a Marathon on an 'average' course in less than 5 hours (or something equivalent).  The 2018 race was the 20th running of the race. There is a limit of 260 entries for the race.

The main features of the race are the delightful countryside of Dartmoor and the associated hills. The total rise of the hills is about 1200 metres (nearly 4000 ft). Because of the hills, times are typically about 50% longer than those of a flat Marathon, even though the course is only 10 km longer than a Marathon.

There are 10 refreshment stations at which water is provided. Facilities are made available for the runners to take their own food and/or drinks from the start to these stations.

History 

The race was first run in 1998 on a slightly longer course (54.918 km, 34 miles 219 yards) which involved the final section from Two Bridges to Princetown going past Dartmoor Prison instead of on the direct route. The same course was used in 1999 and 2000. It was also used in 2018 to celebrate the twentieth running of the event.

The race was cancelled in 2001 because of the Foot and Mouth outbreak and 2020 because of the COVID-19 pandemic. Since 2002, the race has been run on the current, slightly shorter route (the only exception being in 2018 as noted above).

Course 

The race begins in the centre of Princetown (Ordnance Survey mapping six-figure grid reference  at an altitude of 420 metres) and goes along the B3212 to Two Bridges ( 340m). The race then turns east along the B3357. This section is relatively flat until the road drops down into Dartmeet ( 225m) at about 9.5km.

The road now rises steeply onto YarTor Down (355m) before falling again, passing Poundsgate, until it reaches New Bridge ( 100m). The road then rises again (155m) before falling to Holne Bridge ( 60m). The road is now relatively flat and passing Peartree Cross reaches Ashburton ( 70m) at about 21km.
This is the lowest part of the course after a drop of 350 m from the start despite some steep climbs.

In the centre of Ashburton the course takes the road to Buckland in the Moor and rises to Ausewell Cross ( 290m) before dropping to 205 m just before Buckland in the moor ( 230m). At Stone Cross ( 280m) the route turns right onto Pudsham Down ( 360m) when the runners take a sharp left turn down into Widecombe-in-the-Moor ( 240m) at about the 32km point.

Turning left take the road towards Ponsworthy but after about 2km ( 295m) turn right and onto the moor again. The road travels north passed Rowden Cross and Longworthy before the runners turn left ( 315m). This road is followed until the B3212 is reached ( 375m) soon after the Marathon distance.

Turning left the B3212 soon passes Postbridge ( 315m) and eventually reaches the B3357 at Two Bridges ( 340m). The runners then return to Princetown ( 420m) by the B3212.

Past Results 

The winners of the races are given below. The first three races were run on a longer course, as was the 2018 Anniversary race.

The current best times are given below (3:45 for men, 4:20 for women)

External links
Web site with entry form
Previous Results

Ultramarathons in the United Kingdom
Sport in Devon
Dartmoor